Shekaftar is a village in the south of Jalal-Abad Region, Kyrgyzstan. It is part of Chatkal District. Its population was 2,217 in 2021. A uranium mine was located in Shekaftar between 1946 and 1968; the mine was operated by the Sumsar company from 1958 until its deactivation. In 1997, it was reported that a total of eight radioactive waste dumps had been made near Shekaftar.

References

Populated places in Jalal-Abad Region